The Grump is a 2014 Finnish comedy film directed by Dome Karukoski, in which the main character is The Grump, a cranky old man, created by the Finnish author Tuomas Kyrö.

The Grump was selected to compete for the Contemporary World Cinema section at the 2014 Toronto International Film Festival. It is based on a 2014 novel by Kyrö, the third volume by the author, in which this character appears.

The film stars Antti Litja as Mielensäpahoittaja a.k.a. the Grump, Petra Frey, Mari Perankoski, and Iikka Forss. The film tells the story about a stubbornly traditional eighty-year-old farmer — whose social attitudes verge on the prehistoric — raises hell when he is forced to move in with his sadsack, city-dwelling son and successful daughter-in-law.

Cast 
 Antti Litja as the Grump (a.k.a. Mielensäpahoittaja)
 Petra Frey as his missus
 Mari Perankoski as the daughter-in-law
 Iikka Forss as the Grump's son
 Viktor Drevitski as Sergei
 Kari Ketonen as Sakke Intonen
 Mikko Neuvonen as Stinde
 Bruno Puolakainen as Tarasenko
 Janne Reinikainen as Dr. Kiminkinen
 Alina Tomnikov as Ldujmila

Reception 
On review aggregator website Rotten Tomatoes, the film holds an approval rating of 100% based on 7 reviews.

References

External links 
 
 
 

2014 films
2010s Finnish-language films
Films directed by Dome Karukoski
Films set in Helsinki
Films based on Finnish novels
2014 comedy films
Finnish comedy films